Paul William Dyer AO is an Australian musician, conductor and artistic director. He is the artistic director and co-founder of the Australian Brandenburg Orchestra and the Brandenburg Choir. He has played an important role in developing historically informed performance practice of Baroque and early music in Australia.

Career
Dyer studied piano and harpsichord at the Sydney Conservatorium of Music and undertook postgraduate studies with Bob van Asperen at the Royal Conservatory in The Hague.

In 1995 he received a Churchill Fellowship to undertake advanced studies in 17th and 18th Century music performance practices in the UK, Netherlands, and France.

Awards and nominations

ARIA Music Awards
The ARIA Music Awards is an annual awards ceremony that recognises excellence, innovation, and achievement across all genres of Australian music. 

|-
| ARIA Music Awards of 1995
| Handel: Opera Arias 
| ARIA Award for Best Classical Album
| 
|-
| ARIA Music Awards of 1998
| Handel: Arias 
| ARIA Award for Best Classical Album
| 
|-
| ARIA Music Awards of 1999
| If Love's a Sweet Passion 
| ARIA Award for Best Classical Album
| 
|-
| ARIA Music Awards of 2001
| Il Flauto Dolce 
| ARIA Award for Best Classical Album
| 
|-
| ARIA Music Awards of 2009
| Handel: Concerti Grossi Opus 6 
| ARIA Award for Best Classical Album
| 
|-
| ARIA Music Awards of 2010
| Tapas - Tastes of the Baroque 
| ARIA Award for Best Classical Album
| 
|}

Honours
In 2001 he was awarded the Centenary Medal "for service to Australian society and the advancement of music".

In 2013 he was appointed an Officer of the Order of Australia "for distinguished service to the performing arts, particularly orchestral music as a director, conductor and musician, through the promotion of educational programs and support for emerging artists".

Dyer is also Patron of St Gabriel's School for Hearing Impaired Children.

References

External links
 Bach Cantatas

Living people
Year of birth missing (living people)
Australian musicians
Australian conductors (music)
Australian harpsichordists
Officers of the Order of Australia
Recipients of the Centenary Medal
21st-century conductors (music)